Tomorrowland: Our Journey from Science Fiction to Science Fact is a 2015 nonfiction book by science journalist Steven Kotler and published by Amazon Publishing.

Content
The book is composed of a series of essay articles that were published by Kotler in various online news publications, including The New York Times, The Atlantic, and Discover. There are sixteen chapters made up of the same number of articles, each dealing with a different topic of technological innovation in a variety of fields.

Critical reception
Kirkus Reviews praised Kotler for not just presenting the technological innovations themselves, but also focusing on the "obsessive people behind the science" and how his insight into their work encompasses a "range from humane and gripping stories of redemption to indifferent research scientists unsure if their developments will even make the world a better place". Library Journal reviewer Talea Anderson also noted the introduction of each essay and discussed technology focusing on "presenting the array of often quirky inventors and early adopters who have engaged with it" and ultimately recommended the book for readers of popular science. In a separate review in Library Journal of the audiobook, reviewer Lisa Youngblood recommended the book and its look at not only the technology, but also the "social and moral questions that arise" from the potential ramifications of the emerging technologies.

See also

 Futurology
 Abundance: The Future Is Better Than You Think
 Bold: How to Go Big, Create Wealth, and Impact the World

References

External links
 Official website

2015 non-fiction books
American non-fiction books
Technology books
Environmental non-fiction books
Futurology books